Sihem Aouini (born 1982) is a Tunisian team handball player. She plays on the Tunisian national team, and participated at the 2011 World Women's Handball Championship in Brazil.

References

1982 births
Living people
Tunisian female handball players